Joanne B. Freeman (born April 27, 1962) is a U.S. historian and tenured Professor of History and American Studies at Yale University. Having researched Alexander Hamilton both independently and collaboratively with mentors and peers for more than forty years, she is regarded as "a leading expert" on his life and legacy. Freeman has published two books as well as articles and op-eds in newspapers including The New York Times, magazines such as The Atlantic and Slate and numerous academic journals referencing the U.S. Founding Father. In addition to her many public lectures on Hamilton, outside of her regular student curriculum at Yale, her talks on the topics of political partisanship and violence in the pre-Civil War Congress have appeared on C-SPAN. In 2005 she was rated one of the "Top Young Historians" in the U.S.

Early life and education
Freeman was born in Queens, New York City, in 1962. She graduated from Pomona College in 1984 and received both her MA (1993) and PhD (1998) in American History from University of Virginia; her doctoral advisor was Peter S. Onuf, a major scholar on U.S. President Thomas Jefferson. Prior to graduate school, Freeman was a public historian, delivering lectures at a range of US history-centric institutions including the Smithsonian, South Street Seaport, Museum of American Finance and the Library of Congress over a span of seven years.  Her area of expertise is political culture of early America, particularly the revolutionary and early national eras.

Career
In addition to editing Alexander Hamilton: Writings for the Library of America in 2001, Freeman is the author of Affairs of Honor: National Politics in the New Republic (2001). Both books have been quoted in biographies about Hamilton or the Founding Fathers. Her first book, Affairs of Honor, received praise for being "analytically incisive" from Stanford University historian and Pulitzer Prize winner Jack Rakove and "enormously original" from Rutgers University history Professor and Thomas Jefferson scholar Jan Lewis. In this debut work, Freeman lays out the challenges that early patriots faced as they struggled to create a new and independent country. Freeman posits that office-holders and office-seekers were particularly immersed in conflict: "Regional distrust, personal animosity, accusation, suspicion, implication, and denouncement—this was the tenor of national politics from the outset.” 

A prominent focus of her research has been the practice of dueling, including those rules governing one of the most famous encounters in history between Alexander Hamilton and Aaron Burr. In an interview with fellow historians Kenneth T. Jackson and Valerie Paley, Hamilton author Ron Chernow called attention to Freeman's work and her discovery that Hamilton had been involved in ten previous character challenges prior to the eleventh and fatal event: "Joanne Freeman's book explains that a duel is simply the final stage of 'an affair of honor'." In his 2004 book, the Founding Fathers and the Politics of Character, Andrew Trees further cites Freeman's observations that  Hamilton saw honor "as the foundation of Hamilton's vision for himself, the polity, and the nation."  

Freeman's series of lectures on the American Revolution is one of 42 courses offered online by Open Yale Courses.

Freeman has been interviewed for several documentaries about Hamilton. These have aired on American Experience (PBS) and The Discovery Channel. In 2002, she appeared in Founding Brothers with fellow historians Ron Chernow, Richard Brookhiser, David McCullough, and Carol Berkin on The History Channel; the two-part program and overview of five founders – George Washington, Hamilton, John Adams, Benjamin Franklin and Thomas Jefferson – was based on the Pulitzer Prize winning 2000 book of the same title by Joseph Ellis.

Freeman's published findings about the history of dueling helped inspire the song "Ten Duel Commandments" in the Tony Award winning 2015 musical Hamilton by Lin-Manuel Miranda. Though she agrees with fellow historians that the show has historical errors, she is a fan of the Broadway hit and its creator and believes it is engendering interest in the Founding Fathers, ‘‘People should think and evaluate and not necessarily instantly accept stories whether it's on the stage or wherever they get it from,’’ she said. ‘‘The play is getting people to ask a lot of questions about Hamilton and history. (Miranda) would be very happy.’’ Freeman has also appeared in the 2017 PBS documentary Hamilton's America that traced the making of the musical.

Newer projects
Freeman worked for two years as a historical consultant for the National Park Service in the reconstruction of the Hamilton Grange National Memorial.
 In 2017, she edited and published The Essential Hamilton: Letters & Other Writings, with the Library of America.  Her latest book, The Field of Blood:  Violence in Congress and the Road to Civil War, documents and analyzes episodes of physical violence between antagonistic members of U.S. Congress in the decades before the Civil War; it was published September 11, 2018, by Farrar, Straus & Giroux. She has drawn parallels between American parties polarized in the mid-19th century with 21st-century bombast. "Then as now, raising hackles before the eyes of the press was a play for power; politicians who displayed their fighting-man spunk were strutting their suitability as leaders."

Starting February 3, 2017, Freeman joined the crew of the popular weekly American History radio show BackStory as a co-host; the 8-year-old show based out of University of Virginia is also a popular podcast. The premise of the 1 hour program is to examine contemporary happenings through the lens of the past.

Awards

 (2001) Best Book Award, Society for Historians of the Early American Republic
 (2017) William Clyde DeVane Teaching Award "The DeVane Award honors faculty who have distinguished themselves as teachers of undergraduates in Yale College and as scholars in their fields, and has been conferred annually since 1966 by the Yale Chapter of Phi Beta Kappa (PBK)."

Fellowships

 American Council of Learned Societies
 Cullman Center for Scholars and Writers
 Dirkson Congressional Research Center
 J. Franklin Jameson Fellowship Award – Sponsored by the American Historical Association and the Library of Congress (2000–2001)

Publications

Books
  Affairs of Honor: National Politics in the New Republic. New Haven, CT: Yale University Press, 2001; pbk, 2002.  
  Alexander Hamilton: Writings.  New York: Library of America, 2001. 
  The Essential Hamilton – Letters and Other Writings.  New York: Library of America, May 2017 (pbk).  
  The Field of Blood: Violence in Congress and the Road to Civil War.  New York: Farrar, Straus & Giroux, 2018. , 
 Joanne B Freeman; Johann N Neem, Jeffersonians in power : the rhetoric of opposition meets the realities of governing, Charlottesville ; London University of Virginia Press 2019.

Articles and essays
 
 
 </ref> 
 The Election of 1800: A Study in the Logic of Political Change, Yale Law Journal, June 1999
 Dueling as Politics: Reinterpreting the Burr-Hamilton Duel, The William and Mary Quarterly, 3d series, 53 (April 1996): 289–318.
 Slander, Poison, Whispers, and Fame: Jefferson and Political Combat in the Early Republic, Journal of the Early Republic, Spring 1995
 History as Told by the Devil Incarnate: Gore Vidal's Burr, in Novel History: History According to the Novelists, ed. Mark Carnes (Simon & Schuster, 2001)
 The Art and Address of Ministerial Management: Secretary of the Treasury Alexander Hamilton and Congress,' in Neither Separate Nor Equal: Congress and the Executive Branch in the 1790s, ed. Kenneth Bowling (Ohio University Press, 2000)
  Explaining the Unexplainable: Reinterpreting the Sedition Act, in The Democratic Experiment: New Directions in American Political History, ed. Julian Zelizer, Meg Jacobs, and William Novak (Princeton University Press, 2003)
 Corruption and Compromise in the Election of 1800: A Study in the Logic of Political Change, in The Revolution of 1800: Democracy, Race, and the New Republic, ed. Peter S. Onuf and Jan Lewis (University Press of Virginia, September 2002).
 
 "'Can We Get Back to Politics, Please?': Hamilton's Missing Politics in 'Hamilton'."  In Renee C. Romano and Claire Bond Potter, eds., Historians on Hamilton: How a Blockbuster Musical is Restaging America's Past.  New Brunswick, NJ:  Rutgers University Press, 2018.

Additional publications
 Journal of Policy HistoryReferences

Sources

Andrew S. Trees,The Founding Fathers and the Politics of Character'', Princeton University Press, 2004.

External links

21st-century American historians
University of Virginia alumni
Living people
1962 births
Historians of the United States
Yale University faculty
Pomona College alumni
Historians from California
American women historians